Chargé de mission (French for "in charge of mission") is the title of a class of diplomatic envoy. This type of post is created by an embassy to undertake a specific diplomatic project abroad on behalf of a head of mission or the government. Most often, the project is economic or humanitarian in nature.

In France, a chargé de mission can also be a civil servant tasked with a particular matter within an administration.

See also
Attaché
Conseiller chargé des investissements

Sources
UNESCO Chargé de mission

References

Diplomacy